Sharon June "Share" Ross (formerly Pedersen; born Sharon June Howe; March 21, 1963 in Glencoe, Minnesota) is an American musician. She was the bass player of the female hard rock band, Vixen, from whom she has been on hiatus since February 2022.

Music career

Ross joined Vixen in 1987, replacing Pia Maiocco, and remained with the band until 1992. While in Vixen, as a side project, she co-formed the supergroup, Contraband, releasing only one album in 1991. When Vixen reunited in 1997, she declined as she and her husband, Bam had formed the group, Bubble.

In 1997, legendary Texas blues guitarist Denny Freeman, (Bob Dylan, Jimmie Vaughan, Taj Mahal), invited Ross to play bass for his album A Tone For My Sins.

In 1999, Ross and her husband Bam co-wrote the songs on Jesse Camp's debut album, Jesse & The 8th Street Kidz.

The first Bubble album was Ross on guitar and lead vocals, Bam on drums along with Brent Muscat, guitar and Eric Stacy, bass of Faster Pussycat. Bubble won Song of the Year in the John Lennon Songwriting Contest in 2000 with their song, Sparkle Star. It was also featured in the film starring Daryl Hannah, Dancing at the Blue Iguana.

In 2003, Ross toured with her husband's band, The Dogs D'Amour, and opened up for Alice Cooper on a European tour. She contributed to two albums that were released in 2000 for his band before the couple left the group after the tour.

In 2006, Ross became the host and co-producer of the now-defunct video podcast Rock n Roll TV, an online show which featured up-and-coming punk/garage/rock bands and rock news, and in 2010, she played for one night only in a cover band L.A. Nookie, with future Vixen bandmate, Femme Fatale's Lorraine Lewis on vocals, to support Ratt at the latter's party for the release of their seventh and most recent album Infestation. As Share Pedersen, Ross recorded with Ratt's former drummer Bobby Blotzer on Contraband's lone, self-titled album.

In 2012, Ross reunited with her former Vixen bandmates, Roxy Petrucci and Janet Gardner, along with Gina Stile to form a new band originally known as "VXN" and now using simply their names as the band name of JanetShareRoxyGina (or JSRG for short). The band began performing shows in late 2012 and went on tour with the Monsters of Rock cruise in 2013. Late in 2013 JSRG changed their name back to Vixen in accordance with the wishes of founding member and guitarist Jan Kuehnemund who was unable to be part of the reformed band due to her battle with cancer and shock passing on October 10, 2013.

After sitting in on bass with the Quireboys during the 2014 Monsters of Rock Cruise (due to the absence of their regular bassist), she was invited to join Joe Elliott's Down 'n' Outz on their December 2014 UK tour. This Is How We Roll, her first album with that band, came out on October 11, 2019.

In contrast to all of Vixen's past concerts, Ross, who has sung lead for several Bubble albums and Twin Flames Radio, handles lead vocals on the band's cover of "I Don't Need No Doctor" during their recent live tours instead of Gardner, Vixen's long-time lead singer.

On February 8, 2022, Ross announced her hiatus from the band and announced Brazilian Julia Lage as her touring replacement.

Real estate agent
Ross is a licensed real estate agent in the state of Florida. In addition to her musical career, Ross has been a life coach, specializing in confidence-building, with particular reference to self-promotion via video, with her "Video Rockstar University" program, and a motivational course, "MESH". Her programs were predominantly targeted at self-employed businesswomen.

She has also published a book of hip knitting designs, Punk Knits published by Stewart, Tabori and Chang.

Personal life
Share and Bam Ross adopted a raw vegan lifestyle in 2006 through the Raw Pirate Gourmet.

Discography
Vixen
 Vixen (1988)
 Rev It Up (1990)
 Live Fire (2018)

Contraband
 Contraband (1991)

Denny Freeman  
A Tone For My Sins (1997)

Jesse Camp & The 8th Street Kidz
 Jesse Camp & The 8th Street Kidz (1999)

Bubble
How 'Bout This? (2000)
Miss Hellaneous (2001)
Bubble/Black Halos Split Xmas CD (2001)
Rockets & Volcanoes (2001)
Total Harmonic Distortion (2002)
Rock n Roll Hell (2004)

Twin Flames Radio
Twin Flames Radio (2018)

The Dogs D'Amour
Happy Ever After (2000)
Seconds (2000)

Down 'n' Outz
The Further Live Adventures (2015) 
 This Is How We Roll (2019) - Best British Album – Planet Rock Awards

Ginger Wildheart
Ginger Wildheart's Birthday Bash 2018 At The Garage in London (2018)

References

External links
 Share Ross's own site

1963 births
American heavy metal bass guitarists
American heavy metal singers
Glam metal musicians
American women heavy metal singers
American women guitarists
American rock bass guitarists
Women bass guitarists
Living people
Singer-songwriters from Minnesota
People from Glencoe, Minnesota
Women motivational speakers
American real estate brokers
American women singer-songwriters
American rock songwriters
Guitarists from Minnesota
Contraband (band) members
Down 'n' Outz members
Vixen (band) members
20th-century American bass guitarists
21st-century American bass guitarists
20th-century American women musicians
21st-century American women musicians